Get Smart is an American sitcom sequel to the original 1965–1970 NBC/CBS sitcom Get Smart starring Don Adams and Barbara Feldon reprising their characters of Maxwell Smart and Agent 99. The series aired Sunday at 7:30 pm on Fox for seven episodes from January 8 to February 19, 1995.

Overview
Maxwell Smart is the Chief of CONTROL, and Agent 99 is a politician. Their bungling son, Zach (Andy Dick), one of the twins introduced in the fifth season of the original show, becomes CONTROL's star agent. Zach is teamed with the reluctant Agent 66 (Elaine Hendrix) as they try to stop KAOS from controlling the world's economy. Joining Zach and 66 is Trudy (Heather Morgan), an accident prone spy, and Agent 0, a master of disguise.

Characters

Main
Maxwell "Max" Smart (Don Adams) Chief of spy organization CONTROL
Zachary "Zach" Smart (Andy Dick) Max's son and the star agent of CONTROL
Agent 66 (Elaine Hendrix) Zack's partner
Agent 99 (Barbara Feldon) D.C. Congresswoman
Trudy (Heather Morgan) CONTROL's dimwitted secretary

Recurring
The KAOS Chairwoman (Marcia Mitzman Gaven)
Agent 9 (Gabrielle Boni)

Episodes

Production

Conception
The relative success of the 1989 reunion movie Get Smart, Again! eventually prompted the development of a weekly revival of Get Smart, with Don Adams and Barbara Feldon reprising their characters Maxwell Smart and Agent 99 respectively, with Dave Ketchum also reprising his role of Agent 13 and Bernie Kopell reprising his role as Siegfried. Though Zachary Smart's name was revealed in the FOX revival, his twin sister's name remained unrevealed.

Legacy
With the revival series on Fox, Get Smart became the first television franchise to air new episodes on each of the current four major American television networks, although several TV shows in the 1940s and 1950s aired on NBC, CBS, ABC, and DuMont. The different versions of Get Smart did not all feature the original lead cast intact. The first four seasons of the original Get Smart series aired on NBC, while the fifth and final season aired on CBS. Get Smart, Again! aired on ABC.

Ending
The show failed to recapture the spirit of the original, and low ratings with an average of 5 million viewers per episode ranked the series 133rd for 1995. There were no high hopes for the series as Andy Dick had already moved on to NewsRadio, which premiered weeks later in 1995 on NBC.

Home media
The complete series was released on DVD on June 3, 2008, by Sony Pictures Home Entertainment in anticipation of the release of the 2008 film Get Smart starring Steve Carell.

References

External links
Get Smart ! Model '95 (by Sergio Tiraferri)
Groucho Reviews: Get Smart
Get Smart '95 - King of Caronia
 

 
1990s American sitcoms
1995 American television series debuts
1995 American television series endings
English-language television shows
American sequel television series
Espionage television series
Fox Broadcasting Company original programming
Television series by Sony Pictures Television 
Television series by HBO Independent Productions

Television shows set in Washington, D.C.
Adaptations of works by Mel Brooks